Uleiota is a genus of beetles in the family Silvanidae, containing the following species:

 Uleiota africana Grouvelle
 Uleiota alticola Pal
 Uleiota arborea Reitter
 Uleiota atrata Grouvelle
 Uleiota australis Erichson
 Uleiota bicolor Arrow
 Uleiota brevicollis Arrow
 Uleiota capito Pascoe
 Uleiota chilensis Blanchard
 Uleiota cinnamomea Fairmaire
 Uleiota costicollis Reitter
 Uleiota crenicollis Grouvelle
 Uleiota debilis LeConte
 Uleiota dubius Fabricius
 Uleiota fallax Grouvelle
 Uleiota feae Grouvelle
 Uleiota gracilicornis Arrow
 Uleiota indica Arrow
 Uleiota integricollis Fairmaire
 Uleiota macleayi Olliff
 Uleiota militaris Erichson
 Uleiota pallida Arrow
 Uleiota planata Linnaeus
 Uleiota puberula Reitter
 Uleiota quadraticollis Fairmaire
 Uleiota serrata Smith
 Uleiota serricollis Candeze
 Uleiota siamensis Arrow
 Uleiota spinicollis Gory
 Uleiota texana Dajoz
 Uleiota truncata Motschulsky
 Uleiota truncatipennis Heller

References

Silvanidae genera
Articles containing video clips